The Sunair Magic is a German electric or gasoline motor ultralight trike designed and produced by Sunair UG of Scheidegg, Bavaria. The aircraft is supplied complete and ready-to-fly.

Design and development
The Magic was designed as a simple and inexpensive trike, to comply with the German 120 kg class and the US FAR 103 Ultralight Vehicles rules.

The aircraft design features a cable-braced hang glider-style high-wing, weight-shift controls, a single-seat open cockpit without a cockpit fairing, tricycle landing gear and a single engine in pusher configuration.

The aircraft is made from bolted-together aluminum tubing, with its single surface Icaro RX2 hang glider wing covered in Dacron sailcloth. The wing is supported by a single tube-type kingpost and uses an "A" frame weight-shift control bar. Designed for soaring flight, it has a folding, two-bladed composite propeller.

It is designed to be quickly disassembled for ground transport by automobile.

A number of different wings can be fitted to the basic carriage, including the Icaro Relax 18, Aeros 15T, Aeros Fox T and the ATOS VQ 190.

Specifications (Magic)

See also
Sunair Sunlight

References

External links

Magic
2010s German sport aircraft
2010s German ultralight aircraft
Single-engined pusher aircraft
Ultralight trikes
Electric aircraft